Joseph Martinelli (August 22, 1916 – July 20, 1991) was an American soccer forward.  Martinelli spent thirteen seasons in the American Soccer League and earned three caps with the U.S. national team in 1937.

American Soccer League
In 1934, Martinelli began his professional career when he signed with the Pawtucket Rangers of the American Soccer League (ASL).  In 1934 and 1935, the Rangers finished runner-up in the U.S. National Challenge Cup.  After playing in the 1935 Challenge Cup final, Martinelli moved to the New York Americans where he won the 1935–1936 league title.  In 1937, Martinelli finally won the Challenge Cup title when the Americans defeated the St. Louis Shamrocks.  Martinelli then went on to play with several other ASL teams, including Brooklyn St. Mary's Celtic, the Philadelphia German-Americans, Brooklyn Wanderers and Kearny Scots.  He retired in 1947.

National team
While Martinelli was selected for the U.S. squad at the 1934 FIFA World Cup, he did not enter the lone U.S. game, a 7–1 loss to Italy in the first round.  However, Martinelli went on to earn three caps with the U.S. national team in 1937.  All three were losses to Mexico in September.

External links
 National Soccer Hall of Fame eligibility bio

References

United States men's international soccer players
American Soccer League (1933–1983) players
Pawtucket Rangers players
Uhrik Truckers players
Brooklyn Wanderers players
Kearny Scots players
Brooklyn St. Mary's Celtic players
New York Americans (soccer) (1933–1956) players
1934 FIFA World Cup players
American people of Italian descent
1916 births
Year of death missing
American soccer players
Association football defenders